Ko Tong is a village of in the Sai Kung North area of Tai Po District, Hong Kong.

Administration
Ko Tong is a recognized village under the New Territories Small House Policy.

History
At the time of the 1911 census, the population of Ko Tong was 80. The number of males was 34.

See also
 Ko Tong Ha Yeung

References

External links

 Delineation of area of existing village Ko Tong (Sai Kung North) for election of resident representative (2019 to 2022)

Villages in Tai Po District, Hong Kong
Sai Kung North